River Bunhar or Bunha River  or Nala Bunhar starts from Saral Chakwal District in the Punjab Province of Pakistan, and then enters Jhelum District and falls in River Jhelum near Darapur. Near Tilla Jogian its width increases up to 3 kilometers. Many waterfalls from Tilla Jogian also fall in Bunhar. Near Pind Sawika and Wagh villages, this river takes the form of a desert.

References

Jhelum District
Chakwal District
Rivers of Punjab (Pakistan)
Rivers of Pakistan